Ida Sabo (Serbian Cyrillic: Ида Сабо) (Pécs, 6 July 1915 – Novi Sad, 2016) was Yugoslavian communist. During World War II, she joined the Slovene Partisans and after the war she held several offices in Vojvodina.

Awards 

 Order of the Hero of Socialist Labour
 Order of Brotherhood and Unity
 Order "For Merit to the People"
 Order of Bravery
 Commemorative Medal of the Partisans of 1941

References 

Slovene Partisans
League of Communists of Yugoslavia politicians
1915 births
2016 deaths
Yugoslav Partisans members